Cambridge, Nova Scotia may refer to two places in Canada:

 Cambridge, Hants County, Nova Scotia
 Cambridge, Kings County, Nova Scotia